Donald J. Harlin (August 14, 1935 – February 9, 2015) was an American Air Force major general who served as Chief of Chaplains of the United States Air Force.

A native of Flushing, New York where he was born in 1935, Harlin is an ordained Baptist pastor. He is a graduate of Nyack College and Gordon-Conwell Theological Seminary. He died in February 2015 in hospital at LaGrange, Georgia.

Career
Harlin joined the United States Air Force in 1965 and was stationed at Minot Air Force Base. Later, he served in the Vietnam War from 1967 to 1968.

Harlin later became Command Chaplain of Air Training Command, the Air University and Tactical Air Command before being named Deputy Chief of Chaplains of the United States Air Force in 1988. He was promoted to Chief of Chaplains in 1991 and achieved the rank of major general in 1992. Harlin remained Chief of Chaplains until his retirement in 1995.

Awards he received include the Air Force Distinguished Service Medal, the Legion of Merit with two oak leaf clusters, the Bronze Star Medal, the Meritorious Service Medal with three oak leaf clusters and the Air Force Commendation Medal with three oak leaf clusters.

References

1935 births
2015 deaths
Military personnel from New York City
United States Air Force generals
Chiefs of Chaplains of the United States Air Force
Baptist ministers from the United States
Recipients of the Legion of Merit
United States Air Force personnel of the Vietnam War
Nyack College alumni
Gordon–Conwell Theological Seminary alumni
Vietnam War chaplains
Deputy Chiefs of Chaplains of the United States Air Force
Recipients of the Air Force Distinguished Service Medal
Baptists from New York (state)
People from Flushing, Queens
20th-century American clergy